Susana Torrejón (born June 6, 1960) is a Spanish sprint canoer who competed in the early 1990s. At the 1992 Summer Olympics in Barcelona, she was eliminated in the semifinals of the K-1 500 m event.

References
Sports-Reference.com profile

1960 births
Canoeists at the 1992 Summer Olympics
Living people
Olympic canoeists of Spain
Spanish female canoeists
Place of birth missing (living people)
20th-century Spanish women